Folsom Lake Civic Ballet is the official dance company for Folsom, California, USA. It is primarily a pre-professional ballet, and most performers are auditioned from the Folsom dance school Hawkins School of Performing Arts although adult dancers are invited as 'guest artists'.

Important people
 Deirdre Hawkins - Artistic Director
 Ashley (principal)
 Jesslyn (Apprentice)
 Hannah (Apprentice)
 Emily (Apprentice)
 Tess (Apprentice)
 Elaine (Apprentice)
 Paxton (Apprentice)
 Katherine (Trainee)
 Amelia (Trainee)
 Kate (Trainee)
 Kaitlyn (Trainee)
 Kaelyn (Trainee)
 Halie (Trainee)
 Ciara (Trainee)
 Elise (Trainee)
 Alexandra (Trainee)
 Saya (Trainee)
 Elizabeth [monkey] (Trainee) 
 Kendra (Trainee)

Alumni

External links
NEW NAME - Stages Northern California of Performing Arts
Folsom Lake Civic Ballet's Website
Hawkins' School of Performing Arts' website

Ballet companies in the United States
Dance in California
Folsom, California
Tourist attractions in Sacramento County, California